JEROME ROSE, hailed as "the Last Romantic of our own age" is an American pianist and educator, (born 12 August 1938 in Los Angeles). JEROME ROSE is one of America's most distinguished pianists, has been heard in major concert halls across five continents, and is a gold medalist from the International Busoni Competition.

Biography

A pupil of Adolph Baller, Rose had his debut with the San Francisco Symphony at the age of 15. A Mannes College and Juilliard School of Music graduate, he also studied with Leonard Shure and Rudolf Serkin at the Marlboro Music School. He was a Fulbright Scholar in Vienna as well. He won the Gold medal at the 1961 Ferruccio Busoni International Piano Competition.

Rose began his international career while still in his early twenties. He has appeared with such orchestras as the Berlin Philharmonic, Munich Philharmonic, Vienna Symphony, and the Orchestra dell'Accademia Nazionale di Santa Cecilia in Rome. A frequent visitor to London, he has appeared with the London Philharmonic Orchestra, London Symphony Orchestra, and the Royal Philharmonic. In the United States, he has soloed with the Chicago Symphony, Atlanta Symphony, Houston Symphony, Baltimore Symphony, and many others. Conductors include Sir Georg Solti, Wolfgang Sawallisch, Sir Charles Mackerras, Stanisław Skrowaczewski, Sergiu Comissiona, David Zinman, Hans Vonk, Robert Spano and Christian Thielemann.

Rose began his teaching career at the age of 25 years, upon being appointed artist-in-residence at Bowling Green State University. He has given masterclasses at the Moscow Conservatory, the Chopin University of Music in ,Warsaw the Mozarteum University Salzburg in Salzburg, the University of Music and Performing Arts Munich, and is a frequent guest at the Toho Conservatory of Music in Tokyo, Japan. Since 1998, he has been on the faculty of the Mannes College of Music. 

In 1999, he founded the annual International Keyboard Institute/Festival (IKIF), a summer music academy which attracts some of the world's top piano students. Some of the festival's past and present faculty members/artists include Vladimir Feltsman, George Li, Alexander Kobrin, Alexander Braginsky, and many others. Each year, the festival hosts an international piano competition near the end, called the Dorothy MacKenzie Piano Competition. Prizewinners are awarded international performance and recording opportunities, as well as the opportunity to appear at the IKIF as a performer the following year. The IKIF has been held at both Mannes College and at Hunter College. 

Among his students are some of today's leading pianists, including Martín García García, who won the third prize at the XVIII International Chopin Piano Competition and first prize at the Cleveland International Piano Competition in 2021.

He has served on the juries of the Minnesota International Piano-e-Competition, Hamamatsu International Piano Competition, International Chopin Competition, International Franz Liszt Piano Competition, and many others.

Jerome Rose was awarded an Honorary Doctorate in Music from the State University of New York for his lifetime achievement and dedication in music.

He has four children and five grandchildren.

References

External links
Official site
Mannes College The New School for Music
 Medici Classics Productions
 International Keyboard Institute & Festival
David Dubal interview with Jerome Rose, WNCN-FM, 19-Oct-1986
Jerome Rose: The Artist at Home, Episod 1

1938 births
American classical pianists
Male classical pianists
American male pianists
Living people
Prize-winners of the Ferruccio Busoni International Piano Competition
Jewish classical pianists
20th-century American pianists
21st-century classical pianists
20th-century American male musicians
21st-century American male musicians
21st-century American pianists